Lucas Pouille was the defending champion, but lost to Borna Ćorić in the second round.

Kevin Anderson won the title, defeating Kei Nishikori in the final, 6–3, 7–6(7–3). Anderson saved a match point in his opening round match against Nikoloz Basilashvili.

This was Nishikori's ninth consecutive defeat in ATP World Tour level finals. His most recent victory came in February 2016 at Memphis.

Seeds

Draw

Finals

Top half

Bottom half

Qualifying

Seeds

Qualifiers

Lucky losers

Qualifying draw

First qualifier

Second qualifier

Third qualifier

Fourth qualifier

References
 Main draw
 Qualifying draw

Erste Bank Open - Singles
2018 Singles
Erste Bank Open Singles